David Fischerov (born 3 November 1998), also known as David Fischer, is an Austrian-Bulgarian weightlifter. As a junior he has spent several training camps in Bulgaria to increase his performance. David has been disappointed by Austrian weightlifting federation attitude towards him and decided to complete for Bulgarian weightlifting team. He has a Bulgarian fiancée, speaks the Bulgarian language fluently, and was granted a Bulgarian passport in February 2020. His sister is Austrian weightlifter Sarah Fischer.

Career

European Championships
In 2021 he competed at the 2021 European Weightlifting Championships in the 102 kg category, winning the silver in the clean & jerk portion and the 4th in the total. Next year 2022 at 2022 European Weightlifting Championships in the 102 kg category, he become European champion, winning gold in snatch,clean and jeak and total 392 kg.

Major results

References

External links
 
 

1998 births
Living people
Bulgarian male weightlifters
European Weightlifting Championships medalists